For the Summer Olympics, there are four venues that have been used for rugby union.

See also
List of Olympic venues in rugby sevens

References

Rugby
Olympic rugby
Venues